Dragojević (Cyrillic: Драгојевић) is a Croatian, Montenegrin and Serbian surname derived from the masculine given name Dragoje. Notable people with the surname include:

Boris Dragojević (born 1956), Montenegrin painter
Oliver Dragojević (1947–2018), Croatian pop singer
Srđan Dragojević (born 1963), Serbian film director and screenwriter

See also
Dragović
Dragičević
Dragić

Croatian surnames
Montenegrin surnames
Serbian surnames